Albert William Phillip Wolters (1883–1961) was a British psychologist.

History
Wolters spent most of his academic career at the University of Reading. He was initially appointed as a lecturer in the Department of Education in 1908. Here he taught courses in Philosophy and Social Institutions. In 1910 he began teaching psychology and he convinced the university authorities to provide him with facilities to establish a psychological laboratory and subsequently a Department of Psychology.

The School of Psychology and Clinical Language Sciences have established a Walter Wolters Visiting Distinguished Professorship.  These have been presented by such international figures as Noam Chomsky and Daniel Dennett.

Publications
Wolters, A.W.P. (1933). The Evidence of our Senses. London: Methuen.

Awards
1955 - Honorary Fellow, British Psychological Society

References

1893 births
1961 deaths
20th-century British scientists
British psychologists
Academics of the University of Reading
20th-century psychologists